Theissenia is a genus of fungi in the family Graphostromataceae.

The genus was circumscribed by André Maublanc in Bull. Soc. Mycol. France vol.30 on page 51 in 1914.

The genus name of Theissenia is in honour of Ferdinand Theissen (1877–1919), who was a German-Austrian Jesuit priest and mycologist.

Species
As accepted by Species Fungorum;
 Theissenia cinerea 
 Theissenia pyrenocrata 

Former species;
 T. eurima  = Durotheca eurima, Xylariaceae family
 T. rogersii  = Durotheca rogersii, Xylariaceae

References

External links
Index Fungorum

Xylariales